Tomoxioda auropubescens is a species of beetle in the genus Tomoxioda of the family Mordellidae. It was described in 1950.

References

Mordellidae
Beetles described in 1950